The blue-backed parrot (Tanygnathus everetti), also known as Müller's (or Mueller's) parrot  is a large, endangered species of parrot endemic to the Philippines. It is found in tropical moist lowland forests. Flocks are small and often active at night. Its main threats are habitat loss and trapping for the pet trade. 

It is illegal to hunt, capture or possess blue-backed parrots under Philippine Law RA 9147.

Taxonomy 
It was previously conspecific with the azure-rumped parrot (T. sumatranus), but was split as a distinct species by the IUCN Red List and BirdLife International in 2020, and the International Ornithological Congress followed suit in 2022. It can be differentiated from the azure-rumped parrot by its blue back and red iris vs. the azure-rumped parrot's yellow iris and plain green back.

Subspecies 
There are four subspecies:.
 T. e. burbidgii: Sulu Islands. Darker green with lighter collar. Red iris. Much larger at 40cm
 T. e. everetti: Panay, Negros, Leyte, Samar, Mindanao. Mantle and back darker, rump and head lighter. Some blue in mantle. Red iris. Possibly locally extinct on Negros, Panay and Leyte.
 T. e. duponti: Luzon. Dark green with yellow collar. Yellowish underwing coverts. Iris red. Last seen in the 1970s
 T. e. freeri: Polillo Islands. More uniform color with less contrast, more yellow on nape. Iris red. Last seen in 2004. 
Recent studies published by the Oriental Bird Club, suggest that the evertti, duponti and freeri be lumped into one subspecies. Other sources recommend that burbidgii be further studied and possibly be elevated to a full species level.

Description
It is of medium size (32 cm), primarily green with yellowish edging to the wings, a blue rump, and blue wing bends. The head, mantle, wings and tail are darker green, the belly and collar are lighter green. It is sexually dimorphic, with the male having a red beak and the female a pale yellow or horn colored beak.

Habitat 
Very little is known about the ecology of the species, albeit it is likely to occur in similar habitats to the Azure-rumped parrot. The species may therefore occur across tropical, lowland, and montane forests, as well as mangrove swamps and degraded forests being most common below 500 meters above sea level.

Conservation status 
IUCN has assessed this bird as Endangered with population estimates being estimated at 250-999 mature individuals remaining. Others suggest that the population with the Oriental Bird may be even lower citing "the Blue-backed Parrot is represented by a population of potentially far fewer than 300 birds, and a reasonable precaution would place this below 250 and allow the species to be registered as Critically Endangered." This bird is already listed as critically endangered under the National List of Threatened Terrestrial Fauna of the Philippines.

These population counts may be even lowered if the Sulu subspecies burdbdgii is elevated to the full species level.

Conservation actions proposed are surveys across the range of the species are urgently needed to assess the current population any ecological requirement and the impact of trade. Lowland forests across parts of the species's former range, including Luzon and Catanduanes also require ongoing monitoring. Methods of conservation and site protection in Samar and Mindanao must also continue. Instate biodiversity reserves or protected areas across the watersheds and mineral reserves of Dinagat Islands, where large parrots have previously been observed.

A captive-breeding program requires urgent initiation. Captive birds of the two forms everetti and burbidgii must be sought out and acquired for management under government licence, bringing together a multidisciplinary team to oversee the work and develop an integrated ex-situ/in-situ conservation plan. Both subspecies must be kept separate in order to prevent potential Hybridization if or once these studies prove that they are a different species.

References

External links
 Oriental Bird Images: Azure-rumped parrot   Selected photos

blue-backed parrot
blue-backed parrot
Birds of the Philippines